PCCI may refer to:

Organizations and businesses 
 Pensacola Christian College, Inc.
 Philippine Chamber of Commerce and Industry, the official chamber of commerce of the Philippines
 Plymouth Chamber of Commerce & Industry, the largest Chamber in the Southwest peninsula of England
 Pratt Center for Community Development, a university-based advocacy planning and assistance organization in Brooklyn, New York

Science and technology 
 Post-chemotherapy cognitive impairment, cognitive impairment that can result from chemotherapy treatment
 Premixed Charge Compression Ignition, a form of homogeneous charge compression ignition

See also 
 PCI (disambiguation)
 PPCI (disambiguation)